Aaron Roderick (December 20, 1972) is an American football coach and former wide receiver who is currently the offensive coordinator and quarterbacks coach at Brigham Young University (BYU). He was previously BYU's passing game coordinator and quarterbacks coach from 2018 to 2020 and an offensive consultant in 2017. Roderick was previously in other assistant coaching roles, including at the University of Utah from 2005 to 2016 and Southern Utah University (SUU) from 2003 to 2004.

Coaching career

BYU
In 1999, Roderick began his coaching career at BYU, his alma mater, as a graduate assistant for the offense under head coach LaVell Edwards. When Edwards retired as BYU's head coach in 2001, Roderick was retained as a graduate assistant under new head coach Gary Crowton.

Snow College
In 2002, Roderick was hired as the running backs coach at Snow College.

Southern Utah
In 2003, Roderick was named the offensive coordinator, quarterbacks coach and recruiting coordinator at SUU.

Utah
In 2005, Roderick joined the University of Utah as the wide receivers coach. Before the 2009 season, Utah offered Roderick a promotion to co-offensive coordinator and wide receivers coach and he briefly accepted before opting to go to the University of Washington to serve as the wide receivers coach. A few weeks later, Roderick returned to Utah, citing personal reasons, to be the wide receivers coach. In 2010, Roderick was promoted to Utah's co-offensive coordinator and wide receivers coach.

BYU (second stint)
In 2017, Roderick returned to BYU as an offensive consultant. In 2018, Roderick was hired as the passing game coordinator and quarterbacks coach under head coach Kalani Sitake. In 2019, Roderick was a 2019 Broyles Award nominee, an annual award given to the nation's top assistant coach. On January 4, 2021, Roderick was promoted to offensive coordinator and quarterbacks coach, replacing Jeff Grimes, who left to become the offensive coordinator at Baylor University.

Personal life
Roderick graduated from BYU in 1998 with a bachelor's degree in sociology, and earned a master's degree in sociology at BYU in 2002, while working as the running backs coach at Snow College. Roderick is married to Ellen McConnell
and has three children.

References

External links
 Utah Utes Bio
 BYU Cougars Bio

1972 births
Living people
American football wide receivers
BYU Cougars football coaches
BYU Cougars football players
Snow Badgers football coaches
People from Bountiful, Utah
Players of American football from Utah
Ricks Vikings football players
Southern Utah Thunderbirds football coaches
Utah Utes football coaches